Erol Toy (1 October 1936 – 13 March 2021)  was a Turkish writer.

Biography
Toy was born in Manisa, Turkey, and started work after graduating from secondary school. After working as a baker, banker, creator of the mutual organization of sponge fishermen paralysed after decompression problems, he moved to Istanbul. He became a unionist by creating the Bank-İş union. Erol Toy who published his writings in several papers published his first novel in 1952 in the Çınar magazine. As a writer directing the YAZKO council, he wrote on the social, economical and political problems of Turkey. Erol Toy who used social realism, was known to the audience after the first publication of his İmparator (the imperor) novel in 1974. This novel is said to tell the life of Turkish billionaire Vehbi Koç, founder of the Koç group, (this novel was sold to 1.5 million since its publication, according to his publisher). Erol Toy who published short stories, novels, essays and critiques and several plays of which have been acted, received third place at the Ali Naci Karacan prize in 1962. None of his creations was translated yet.

In May and June 2011, his play Pir Sultan Abdal, toured in Germany and in France by Ankara Birlik Tiyatrosu.

Short stories
Yenilgi – The defeat – 1967
Iğrıp –  The small boat – 1977

Books for children
Fareler Cumhuriyeti – The republic of the mices – 1975
Altın Saray – The golden palace – 1980
Son Çağrı – The last resort – 1981
Avcı Kekliği – Hunting licence – 1982
Aliş İle Koşka – Alishe and Koshka – 2003

Novels
Toprak Acıkınca – When earth is thirsty – 1968
Acı Para – Bitter money – 1970
Azap Ortakları – Companions of suffering – 1973
İmparator – The emperor – 1973
Kördüğüm – The Gordian Knot – 1974
Son Seçim – The last choice – 1976
Gözbağı – Blinders – 1976
Doruktaki Öfke – Angers at the top – 1977
Kuzgunlar ve Leşler – Crows and deads – 1978
Zor Oyunu – 1980 – The law of the strongest – 1980
Kilittaşı – The keystone – 1988
Yitik Ülkü Cilt −1 – Lost ideal Tome 1 – 1995
Yitik Ülkü Cilt −2 – Lost ideal Tome 2
Yitik Ülkü Cilt −3 – Lost ideal Tome 3
Arinna'nın Gölgesi – On the shadow of Arinna – 2000
Sır Küpü – The well of secrets – 2004
Bade Harab – Sour wine – 2010
Hoca Efendi – Hodja Efendi – 2011

Plays
Pir sultan Abdal – 1968
Parti Pehlivan – 1973
Meddah – The actor – 1971
Düş ve Gerçek – Dream and reality – 1972
İzmir'in İçinde – Inside Izmir – 1973
İpteki – At the end of the cord – 1973
Lozan – Lausanne – 1973
Çeliğe Su Vermek – Watering the cuttings – 1980
Kadınlar Matinesi – The women's morning – 1992
Kongre – The congress – 1995Kırat'ın Süvarisi – 1998Dağ Küreden Yer Küreye – 2007

EssaysTürk Gerilla Tarihi – History of Turkish guerilla – 1970Bal Tutanlar – The ones holding honey – 1976Aydınımız İnsanımız Devletimiz – Our intellectuals, our people, our State – 1982Ordu ve Politika – Army and politics – 1983O'na Katılmak – Participate to itStoriesGünü Gününe – From day to day – 1981Meclisler ve Partiler – Parliaments and parties – 1990Yazko'nun Öyküsü – History of Yazko, writers' and publishers' cooperative'' – 2007

References

1936 births
2021 deaths
People from Manisa
Turkish writers